Vrapčište is a village and seat of the municipality of Vrapčište, North Macedonia.

History
A policy of Turkification of the Albanian population was employed by the Yugoslav authorities in cooperation with the Turkish government, stretching the period of 1948-1959.  Starting in 1948, Turkish schools were opened in areas with large Albanian majorities, such as Vrapčište.

Demographics
As of the 2021 census, Vrapčište had 4,003 residents with the following ethnic composition:
Turks 2,765
Albanians 912
Persons for whom data are taken from administrative sources 203
Macedonians 118
Others 5

According to the 2002 census, the village had a total of 4,874 inhabitants. Ethnic groups in the village include:
Turks 2,899
Albanians 1,777
Macedonians 172
Others 26

Sports
Local football club FK Vrapčište plays in the OFS Gostivar league.

References

External links

Villages in Vrapčište Municipality
Albanian communities in North Macedonia